Temple Houston is an American television series starring Jeffrey Hunter as real-life 19th century Texas lawyer Temple Lea Houston. It ran for one season on NBC from 1963 to 1964. It is considered "the first attempt ... to produce an hour-long western series with the main character being an attorney in the formal sense." Temple Houston was the only program which Jack Webb sold to a network during his ten months as the head of production at Warner Bros. Television. It was also the lone series in which Hunter played a regular part. The series' supporting cast features Jack Elam  and Chubby Johnson.

Plot
Temple Houston is based loosely on the career of the real-life circuit-riding lawyer Temple Lea Houston (1860–1905), son of the more famous Sam Houston. Little, however, binds all the episodes together under a common framework. The series variously cast the characters and situations in both an overtly humorous and a deadly serious light. Author-historian (and attorney) Francis M. Nevins asserts of the first episode entitled "The Twisted Rope", "Clearly, the concept here is Perry Mason out West", going so far as to note that Temple Houston's court opponent "apes Hamilton Burger by accusing Houston of 'prolonging this trial with a lot of dramatic nonsense'". Later episodes turned Houston into more of a detective than a lawyer. Over the course of the series, the bulk of the narrative sees Houston actually gathering evidence, rather than trying cases. In the end, the series largely eschewed criminal law in favor of overtly humorous plots, such as in the episode "The Law and Big Annie", in which Houston uses his legal expertise to help a friend decide what to do after he inherits an elephant.

The producers tried to avoid any storylines that would embarrass the two surviving children of Temple Houston who were still living when the series aired.

Cast

Main cast
 Jeffrey Hunter as Temple Lea Houston
 Jack Elam as George Taggart
 Frank Ferguson as Judge Gurney
 Chubby Johnson as Concho
 Mary Wickes as Ida Goff

Guest stars

Parley Baer
Charles Bateman
James Best
Patricia Blair
Eric Braeden
Robert Bray
Kathie Browne
Walter Burke
Robert Conrad
William Conrad
Russ Conway
Royal Dano
John Dehner
William Fawcett

Shug Fisher
Constance Ford
Douglas Fowley
Anne Francis
Victor French
Virginia Gregg
Ron Hayes
Rodolfo Hoyos Jr.
Anne Helm
Richard Jaeckel
Victor Jory
Susan Kohner
Robert Lansing

Dayton Lummis
J. Pat O'Malley
Paula Raymond
Tom Skerritt
Everett Sloane
Connie Stevens
Frank Sutton
Karl Swenson
Russell Thorson
Peter Whitney
Collin Wilcox
Van Williams
Morgan Woodward

Episode list

Production

Pilot
The earliest known conceptual documents for Temple Houston date back to 1957.  It took about six years for a pilot to be filmed. That pilot, The Man from Galveston, was filmed in March 1963, but was never broadcast on television. Instead, the 57-minute film was released theatrically late in 1963. The series used a different cast from the movie pilot. Jeffrey Hunter was the only cast member to star in both pilot and series, although his character was re-dubbed Timothy Higgins in the pilot when it was released as a theatrical film.

The series was produced by Warner Bros. Television and Apollo Productions, a company co-owned by star Jeffrey Hunter, who had demanded to produce it in exchange for a film and television commitment to Warner Bros.

By December 1963, the series was rated 31st of the 32 new shows that season. NBC then ordered a switch back to more humorous stories. but the change merely allowed the series to continue to the end of the season.

Cancellation
Temple Houston was pulled after one season of twenty-six episodes.  Hunter later indicated that he thought the series failed because of an inability to establish a consistent tone.

Syndication
Because the show produced so few episodes, it had little presence on the domestic syndication market. However, it appears to have enjoyed limited international syndication. The series was shown in Japan in 1963, and on Australian regional television station GTS-4 in 1974.

In the United Kingdom the series was shown on BBC One television between October 1964 and July 1965, inspiring one of the few pieces of memorabilia from the show—a 1965 British annual. As in the US, the pilot The Man From Galveston was never shown on UK TV but did duty as a cinema second feature in April 1964 (supporting Warner's Mary, Mary).

External links

Temple Houston: The Story Behind a Forgotten Western.
Temple Houston page at A Tribute to Jeffrey Hunter website
Temple Houston at the Classic TV Archive

References

1963 American television series debuts
1964 American television series endings
1960s American legal television series
1960s Western (genre) television series
Black-and-white American television shows
NBC original programming
Television series by Warner Bros. Television Studios
Television shows set in Texas